Steel City is an unincorporated community in Benton Township, Franklin County, Illinois, USA. It is located about a mile east of the county seat of Benton on Illinois Route 34.

References 

Unincorporated communities in Franklin County, Illinois
Unincorporated communities in Illinois